"Another Rainy Day in New York City" is a song written by Robert Lamm for the group Chicago and recorded for their album Chicago X (1976). Described as "the only typical Chicago cut on the album[:] upbeat and light with good blending of lead vocal by [Peter] Cetera", the track would be the album's lead single but was largely passed over for radio airplay in favor of the album cut "If You Leave Me Now". Rush-released as a single, "If You Leave Me Now" debuted on the Billboard Hot 100 of 14 August 1976 at No. 60 - on its way to No. 1 - and immediately eclipsed "Another Rainy Day..." which on the same chart fell to No. 46 from its No. 32 peak. "Another Rainy Day..." peaked at No. 2 on the Billboard Adult Contemporary chart.  Billboard described the song as "a pop /jazzy rocker with a touch of reggae flavor."  Cash Box said that "the lyric is good, really creates a mood." Record World called it a "Caribbean-styled number is handled with the band's consummate professionalism and good taste."

Personnel
 Peter Cetera – lead and backing vocals, bass
 Terry Kath – electric and twelve-string acoustic guitars, backing vocals
 Robert Lamm – piano, backing vocals
 Lee Loughnane – trumpet, backing vocals
 James Pankow – trombone
 Walter Parazaider – tenor saxophone, flute
 Danny Seraphine – drums
 Laudir de Oliveira – congas, guiro, shakers and wind chimes
Additional personnel
 Othello Molineaux – steel drums
 Leroy Williams – steel drums

References

Chicago (band) songs
1976 singles
Songs written by Robert Lamm
Song recordings produced by James William Guercio
Columbia Records singles
Songs about New York City